Artiom Pipa (born ) is a Moldovan male weightlifter, competing in the 77 kg category and representing Moldova at international competitions. He competed at world championships, including at the 2015 World Weightlifting Championships. He also competed as a junior for Moldova at world championships, winning the bronze medal at the 2010 U-20 edition, and also 3 bronze medals at the 2009 world championships in Chiangmai (Thailand). In 2008 he became junior European Champion in Durres (Albania).

In 2015 the International Weightlifting Federation (IWF) has suspended Pipa for anti-doping rule violation, after he returned a positive sample for anabolic agents.

Major results

References

1992 births
Living people
Moldovan male weightlifters
Place of birth missing (living people)
Doping cases in weightlifting
Moldovan sportspeople in doping cases